After Pilkington is a BBC television drama film written by Simon Gray, starring Miranda Richardson, Bob Peck and Barry Foster. It was first broadcast as part of BBC Two's Screen Two series, in 1987.

Plot 
The quiet life of Oxford professor James Westgate (Bob Peck) is shattered when he is introduced to Penny (Miranda Richardson), the wife of his crass new colleague (Barry Foster). Westgate recognises her as his childhood sweetheart "Patch", and the two resume their friendship.  Westgate is bored with his mundane college life, including his German friend Boris who experiments on animals in the lab, and his lady friend Amanda, as well as the attentions of a shy male student who claims to be in love with him.  He is only too happy to be diverted into joining Penny in her search for missing archaeologist Pilkington (a fellow Oxford colleague). As Westgate's obsession with his childhood friend grows, he is drawn into a tangle of misunderstanding, intrigue, and murder.  Bob Peck imbues his character with comic ineptitude.

The film frequently has the 4th movement from Schubert's Trout Quintet on the soundtrack.

Awards and nominations
 Best Actress (nomination): Miranda Richardson - BAFTA TV Awards
 Best Fiction (won) - Prix Italia

Cast
Bob Peck as James Westgate
Miranda Richardson as Penny 'Patch' Newhouse
Reina James as Amanda
Gary Waldhorn as Boris
Barry Foster as Derek
Sarah Butler as Young Penny
Richard Grant as Young James
Richard Brenner as Wilkins
Mary Miller as Deirdre Pilkington
Derek Ware as Pilkington
Nigel Nevinson as Doctor
John Gill as Pottsy

References

External links 

New York Times review
Cast and credit information from Screen Two website
Memorable TV review

1987 television films
1987 films
BBC television dramas
Prix Italia winners